Manuel López Ochoa (7 July 1933 in Torno Largo, Tabasco, Mexico – 25 October 2011 in Los Angeles, United States) was a Mexican actor.

Filmography
El crisol (1964), a telenovela
The Bandits (film) (1967) as Valdez
Chucho el roto, a telenovela
 Chispita (1982) Telenovela 
En carne propia (1990), a telenovela

References

External links

1933 births
2011 deaths
Male actors from Tabasco
Mexican male film actors
Mexican male stage actors
Mexican male telenovela actors
Mexican male television actors